Prince William Frederick, Duke of Gloucester and Edinburgh,  (15 January 1776 – 30 November 1834) was a great-grandson of King George II of Great Britain and the nephew and son-in-law of King George III. He was the grandson of both Frederick, Prince of Wales (George II's eldest son), and Edward Walpole. Prince William married Princess Mary, the fourth daughter of George III.

Early life

Prince William Frederick was born on 15 January 1776 at Palazzo Teodoli in via del Corso, Rome. His father was Prince William Henry, Duke of Gloucester and Edinburgh, the third son of the Prince of Wales. His mother, Maria, was the illegitimate daughter of Edward Walpole and granddaughter of Robert Walpole. As a great-grandson of George II he held the title of Prince of Great Britain with the style His Highness, not His Royal Highness, at birth. The young prince was baptized at Teodoli Palace, on 12 February 1776 by a Rev Salter. His godparents were his father's cousin and cousin-in-law, the Duke and Duchess of Saxe-Gotha-Altenburg; and the Duke of Gloucester's second cousin, the Margrave of Brandenburg-Ansbach.

During his stay in Stockholm in 1802–1803, William's interest and rumoured affair with Aurora Wilhelmina Koskull attracted a lot of attention, and he reportedly had plans to marry her. Queen Charlotte recalled that William said of Koskull: "If she was your daughter, I would marry her!"

William was admitted to the University of Cambridge (Trinity College) in 1787, and granted his MA in 1790. He set up his London home at 31 Upper Grosvenor Street, Mayfair.  On 25 August 1805, Prince William's father died, and he inherited the titles Duke of Gloucester and Edinburgh and Earl of Connaught. 

From 1811 until his death William was Chancellor of the University of Cambridge. He was offered the  throne of Sweden in 1812 by some members of the Swedish nobility, but the British government would not allow it; the French marshal Jean-Baptiste Bernadotte was eventually selected to become King Charles XIV John.

Marriage
On 22 July 1816, Prince William married his first cousin Princess Mary, the fourth daughter of King George III. The marriage took place at St. James's Palace, London. On that day, the Prince Regent granted the Duke the style of His Royal Highness by Order in Council.

The Duke and Duchess of Gloucester lived at Bagshot Park in Surrey. They had no children together; they had married when both were 40. The Duke had been encouraged to stay single, so that there might be a suitable groom for Princess Charlotte of Wales, the heiress to the throne, even if no foreign match proved suitable; she had married Prince Leopold of Saxe-Coburg ten weeks earlier.

Later life
William was active in many walks of life, and on 27 April 1822 he chaired the first Annual General Meeting of London's new United University Club. Politics, however, was not among them; he entered the House of Lords rarely, and he voted on few of the great issues of his time. He did advocate the abolition of slavery, and he supported Caroline of Brunswick and Prince Augustus Frederick, Duke of Sussex, against King George IV.

The Duke of Gloucester kept more state than the King; he never permitted a gentleman to be seated in his presence (which King George did as an exceptional favour) and expected to be served coffee by the ladies of any party he attended, and that they would stand while he drank it. The general estimate of his capacity is given by his nickname, "Silly Billy"; he was also called "Slice of Gloucester" and "Cheese", a reference to Gloucester cheese.

Because of the unequal character of his parents' marriage, the Duke was excluded from the House of Hanover, being considered only a British prince. For instance, he and his sister Sophia were not listed in the genealogical listing of the electoral house of Hanover in the Königlicher Groß-Britannischer und Kurfürstlicher Braunschweig-Lüneburgscher Staats-Kalender. He was also not invited to sign the family compact of the house of Brunswick-Lüneburg in 1831, which means that he was not considered an agnate of the royal (electoral) house in Germany.

The Duke died on 30 November 1834 at Bagshot Park, and was buried in St. George's Chapel, Windsor.

Honours
KG: Knight of the Garter, 16 July 1794

Arms

William was granted use of his father's arms (being the arms of the kingdom, differenced by a label argent of five points, the centre bearing a fleur-de-lys azure, the other points each bearing a cross gules), the whole differenced by a label argent (or azure).

Ancestry

See also
List of British princes

References

1776 births
1834 deaths
Alumni of Trinity College, Cambridge
Princes of Great Britain
Princes of the United Kingdom
British field marshals
Chancellors of the University of Cambridge
102
Grenadier Guards officers
House of Hanover
Knights Grand Cross of the Order of the Bath
Knights of the Garter
Members of the Privy Council of the United Kingdom
People from Bagshot
Fellows of the Royal Society
Royal Warwickshire Fusiliers officers
Scots Guards officers
Burials at St George's Chapel, Windsor Castle